Qarachi is a noble title in the Turkic khanates of the 14–16th centuries.

Qarachi or Qaraçı may also refer to:
 Qaraçı, the Azerbaijani name of the Garachi group of Romani people
 Qaraçı, Azerbaijan, a village in the Khachmaz Rayon  of Azerbaijan

See also
 Karachi, the largest city in Pakistan